Pamulinawen may refer to:

 Pamulinawen (folk song) - a popular old Ilocano language folk song in the Philippines

 Pamulinawen Festival - a festival in Laoag, Ilocos Norte, Philippines commemorating the feast of Saint William.